Dane Kuprešanin (born 12 June 1966) is a Bosnian-Herzegovinian retired footballer who played as an attacking midfielder.

Club career
Born in Sarajevo, Socialist Federal Republic of Yugoslavia, Kuprešanin started playing professionally with hometown's FK Sarajevo, making his Yugoslav First League debuts at the age of 19 and remaining six seasons with the club, for which he scored 17 top division goals in his last two years combined.

In the summer of 1991 Kuprešanin moved to Portugal and signed for F.C. Famalicão, alongside Sarajevo teammate Bernard Barnjak, as the northern side was coached by compatriot Josip Skoblar. In his debut campaign he ranked second in goals scored in the team, as it managed to maintain its top division status.

Subsequently, Kuprešanin moved to another club in the country, perennial UEFA Cup qualification candidates Vitória de Guimarães. In his first year he only appeared in 18 league games, but proved instrumental in the season's UEFA Cup, netting twice in a 3–0 first-round home win against Real Sociedad (3–2 aggregate win). He spent a further three seasons in Minho, suffering a serious knee injury in 1996 which forced him to retire from the game at only 30.

References

External links

1966 births
Living people
Footballers from Sarajevo
Association football midfielders
Yugoslav footballers
Bosnia and Herzegovina footballers
FK Sarajevo players
F.C. Famalicão players
Vitória S.C. players
Yugoslav First League players
Primeira Liga players
Yugoslav expatriate footballers
Expatriate footballers in Portugal
Bosnia and Herzegovina expatriate footballers
Bosnia and Herzegovina expatriate sportspeople in Portugal